Marcelo Ernesto Torrico Terán (born January 11, 1972 in Cochabamba) is a retired Bolivian football goalkeeper. He was part of the Bolivia national football team in the 1994 FIFA World Cup. He played for The Strongest.

References
playerhistory 

1972 births
Living people
Bolivian footballers
Association football goalkeepers
Bolivia international footballers
1994 FIFA World Cup players
1993 Copa América players
1995 Copa América players
The Strongest players